William Wilson (October 26, 1917 – February 27, 1984) was an American field hockey player. He competed in the men's tournament at the 1948 Summer Olympics.

References

External links
 

1917 births
1984 deaths
American male field hockey players
Olympic field hockey players of the United States
Field hockey players at the 1948 Summer Olympics
Sportspeople from New York City